No más (Spanish for "no more") may refer to:

 "No Más" (Breaking Bad), a season three episode of the TV series Breaking Bad
 Sugar Ray Leonard vs. Roberto Durán II, a 1980 boxing match known as the "No Más Fight"
 No Más (album), a 2010 album by American duo Javelin
 An "I quit" match in the professional wrestling promotion Lucha Underground

See also
 No More (disambiguation)